Pochinok may refer to:
Pochinok (inhabited locality), name of several inhabited localities in Russia
Pochinok, a type of rural locality in Russia
Alexander Pochinok (1958–2014), Russian politician

See also
 Pochinkovsky (disambiguation)

Russian-language surnames